The 48th NAACP Image Awards, presented by the NAACP, honored outstanding representations and achievements of people of color in motion pictures, television, music and literature during the 2016 calendar year. The 48th ceremony was hosted by Anthony Anderson and broadcast on TV One on February 12, 2017. 

American 14th Secretary of the Smithsonian Institution, Lonnie Bunch was honored with the President's Award for his studies of American and African history, as well as his contribution as the founding director of the Smithsonian's National Museum of African American History and Culture. Harvard Law School ProfessorCharles Ogletree was awarded with the Chairman's Award.

All nominees are listed below, and the winners are listed in bold.

Special Awards

Motion Picture

Television

Outstanding Drama Series
 Queen Sugar
 Empire
 Power
 This Is Us
 Underground

Outstanding Actor in a Drama Series
 Sterling K. Brown – This Is Us
 Mike Colter – Marvel's Luke Cage
 Omari Hardwick – Power
 Terrence Howard – Empire
 Kofi Siriboe – Queen Sugar

Outstanding Actress in a Drama Series
 Taraji P. Henson – Empire
 Viola Davis – How to Get Away with Murder
 Jurnee Smollett-Bell – Underground
 Kerry Washington – Scandal
 Rutina Wesley – Queen Sugar

Outstanding Supporting Actor in a Drama Series
 Jussie Smollett – Empire 
 Trai Byers – Empire 
 Alfred Enoch – How to Get Away with Murder
 Joe Morton – Scandal 
 Jesse Williams – Grey's Anatomy

Outstanding Supporting Actress in a Drama Series
 Naturi Naughton – Power
 CCH Pounder – NCIS: New Orleans
 Cicely Tyson – How to Get Away with Murder
 Lynn Whitfield – Greenleaf
 Amirah Vann – Underground

Outstanding Directing in a Dramatic Series
 John Singleton – The People v. O. J. Simpson: American Crime Story – "The Race Card"
 Millicent Shelton – Empire – The Lyon Who Cried Wolf"
 Sam Esmail – Mr. Robot – "eps2.5_h4ndshake.sme"
 Paris Barclay – Pitch – "Pilot"
 Anthony Hemingway – Underground – "The Macon 7"

Outstanding Writing in a Dramatic Series
 Ava DuVernay – Queen Sugar – "First Things First"
 Akela Cooper – Marvel's Luke Cage – "Manifest"
 Anthony Sparks – Queen Sugar – "By Any Chance"
 Joe Robert Cole – The People v. O. J. Simpson: American Crime Story – "The Race Card"
 LaToya Morgan – Turn: Washington's Spies – "Benediction"

Outstanding Comedy Series
 Black-ish
 Atlanta
 The Carmichael Show
 Insecure
 Survivor's Remorse

Outstanding Actor in a Comedy Series
 Anthony Anderson – Black-ish
 Don Cheadle – House of Lies
 Donald Glover – Atlanta
 Kevin Hart – Real Husbands of Hollywood
 Dwayne Johnson – Ballers

Outstanding Actress in a Comedy Series
 Tracee Ellis Ross – Black-ish
 Uzo Aduba – Orange is the New Black
 Niecy Nash – The Soul Man
 Issa Rae – Insecure
 Keesha Sharp – Lethal Weapon

Outstanding Supporting Actor in a Comedy Series
 Laurence Fishburne – Black-ish
 Miles Brown – Black-ish 
 Tituss Burgess – Unbreakable Kimmy Schmidt
 Deon Cole – Black-ish 
 David Alan Grier – The Carmichael Show

Outstanding Supporting Actress in a Comedy Series
 Adrienne C. Moore – Orange is the New Black
 Erica Ash – Survivor's Remorse
 Laverne Cox – Orange Is the New Black
 Marsai Martin – Black-ish
 Yvonne Orji – Insecure

Outstanding Directing in a Comedy Series
 Donald Glover – Atlanta – "Value"
 Anton Cropper – Black-ish – "God"
 Anton Cropper – Black-ish – "Good-ish Times"
 Melina Matsoukas – Insecure – "Insecure as F**k"
 Marta Cunningham – Transparent – "Exciting and New"

Outstanding Writing in a Comedy Series
 Kenya Barris – Black-ish – "Hope"
 Donald Glover – Atlanta – "B.A.N."
 Issa Rae and Larry Wilmore – Insecure – "Insecure as F**k"
 Prentice Penny – Insecure – "Real as F**k"
 Our Lady J – Transparent – "If I Were a Bell"

Outstanding Television Movie, Limited-Series or Dramatic Special
 The People v. O. J. Simpson: American Crime Story
 American Crime
 Confirmation 
 The Night Of
 Roots

Outstanding Actor in a Television Movie, Limited-Series or Dramatic Special
 Courtney B. Vance – The People v. O. J. Simpson: American Crime Story
 Sterling K. Brown – The People v. O. J. Simpson: American Crime Story
 Cuba Gooding Jr. – The People v. O. J. Simpson: American Crime Story
 Malachi Kirby – Roots 
 Jeffrey Wright – Confirmation

Outstanding Actress in a Television Movie, Limited-Series or Dramatic Special
 Regina King – American Crime
 Emayatzy Corinealdi – Roots
 Audra McDonald – Lady Day at Emerson's Bar and Grill 
 Anika Noni Rose – Roots
 Kerry Washington – Confirmation

Outstanding Directing in a Motion Picture (Television)
 Rick Famuyiwa – Confirmation
 Carl Seaton – Bad Dad Rehab
 Mario Van Peebles – Roots (Night 2)
 Thomas Carter – Roots (Night 3)
 Vondie Curtis-Hall – Toni Braxton: Unbreak My Heart

Outstanding Writing in a Motion Picture – (Television)
 Charles Murray – Roots (Night 3)
 Alison McDonald – An American Girl Story - Melody 1963: Love Has to Win
 Rashida Jones and Michael Schur – Black Mirror  ("Nosedive")
 Rhonda Freeman-Baraka – Merry Christmas, Baby!
 Alison McDonald – Roots (Night 2)

Outstanding Performance by a Youth (Series, Special, Television Movie or Limited Series)
 Marsai Martin – Black-ish
 Emyyri Crutchfield – Roots
 Hudson Yang – Fresh Off The Boat
 Lonnie Chavis – This Is Us
 Miles Brown – Black-ish

Outstanding Talk Series
 Steve Harvey
 The Real
 Super Soul Sunday
 The Talk
 The View

Outstanding Variety (Series or Special)
 2016 Black Girls Rock
 Celebrity Family Feud
 The Essence Black Women in Hollywood Awards 2016
 Lemonade
 Lip Sync Battle

Outstanding Reality Program/Reality Competition Series
 Iyanla: Fix My Life
 Little Big Shots
 Mary Mary
 United Shades of America
 The Voice

Outstanding Children’s Program
 An American Girl Story - Melody 1963: Love Has to Win
 All In with Cam Newton
 Doc McStuffins
 K.C. Undercover
 The Lion Guard

Outstanding News / Information – (Series or Special)
 BET Presents: Love And Happiness: An Obama Celebration
 AM Joy with Joy Reid
 StarTalk with Neil deGrasse Tyson
 Stay Woke
 Unsung: Sugarhill Gang

Outstanding Host in a Talk, Reality, News/ Information or Variety (Series or Special)
 Roland S. Martin – NewsOne Now with Roland S. Martin (TV One)
 Anthony Anderson and Tracee Ellis Ross – BET Awards 2016
 W. Kamau Bell – United Shades of America
 Steve Harvey – Steve Harvey
 Joy Reid – AM Joy with Joy Reid

Documentary

Outstanding Documentary – (Film)
 13th
 I Am Not Your Negro
 Maya Angelou: And Still I Rise
 Miss Sharon Jones!
 Olympic Pride, American Prejudice

Outstanding Documentary – (Television)
 Roots: A New Vision
 Major League Legends: Hank Aaron
 Policing the Police
 Roots: A History Revealed
 Streets of Compton

Animated/CGI

Outstanding Character Voice-Over Performance – (Television or Film)
 Idris Elba – The Jungle Book
 Loretta Devine – Doc McStuffins
 Idris Elba – Finding Dory
 Kevin Hart – The Secret Life of Pets
 Dwayne Johnson – Moana

Music

Outstanding New Artist
 Chance the Rapper
 Ro James
 MAJOR.
 Serayah
 Chloe x Halle

Outstanding Male Artist
 Maxwell
 Chance the Rapper
 Kendrick Lamar
 Bruno Mars
 Anthony Hamilton

Outstanding Female Artist
 Beyoncé
 Fantasia
 Alicia Keys
 K. Michelle
 Solange

Outstanding Duo, Group or Collaboration
 Beyoncé feat. Kendrick Lamar – "Freedom"
 Alicia Keys feat. ASAP Rocky – "Blended Family (What You Do for Love)"
 Solange feat. Lil Wayne – "Mad"
 Robert Glasper and Miles Davis – "Everything's Beautiful"
 Sounds of Blackness feat. HSRA (High School for Recording Arts) – "Royalty"

Outstanding Jazz Album
 Edward Simon – Latin American Songbook
 Leslie Odom Jr. – Leslie Odom Jr.
 Branford Marsalis Quartet and Kurt Elling – Upward Spiral
 Robert Glasper and Miles Davis – Everything's Beautiful
 Erroll Garner – Ready Take One

Outstanding Gospel Album – Traditional or Contemporary
 Tamela Mann – One Way
 Donnie McClurkin – The Journey (Live)
 Myron Butler – Myron Butler & Levi On Purpose
 Livre – Jericho: Tribe of Joshua
 Fred Hammond – Worship Journal Live

Outstanding Music Video
 Beyoncé – "Formation"
 Johnny Gill feat. New Edition – "This One's for Me and You"
 Bruno Mars – "24K Magic"
 Solange – "Cranes in the Sky"
 Alicia Keys – "In Common"

Outstanding Song, Contemporary
 Beyoncé feat. Kendrick Lamar – "Freedom"
 Common feat. Bilal – "Letter to the Free"
 Sounds of Blackness feat. HSRA (High School for Recording Arts) – "Royalty"
 Bruno Mars – "24K Magic"
 Beyoncé – "Formation"

Outstanding Song, Traditional
 Kim Burrell and Pharrell Williams – "I See Victory"
 Solange – "Cranes in the Sky"
 Anthony Hamilton – "Amen"
 Tamela Mann – "God Provides"
 Maxwell – "Lake by the Ocean"

Outstanding Album
 Beyoncé – Lemonade
 Solange – A Seat at the Table
 Kendrick Lamar – untitled unmastered.
 Chance the Rapper – Coloring Book
 Anthony Hamilton – What I'm Feelin'

Literature

Outstanding Literary Work, Fiction
 Bernice L. McFadden – The Book of Harlan
 Jacqueline Woodson – Another Brooklyn
 Lawrence Hill – The Illegal
 Yvvette Edwards – The Mother
 Colson Whitehead – The Underground Railroad: A Novel

Outstanding Literary Work, Non-Fiction
 Margot Lee Shetterly – Hidden Figures
 Eddie S. Glaude Jr. – Democracy in Black: How Race Still Enslaves the American Soul
 Angela Y. Davis – Freedom is a Constant Struggle
 Ibram X. Kendi – Stamped from the Beginning: The Definitive History of Racist Ideas in America
 Kareem Abdul-Jabbar and Raymond Obstfeld – Writings on the Wall: Searching for a New Equality Beyond Black and White

Outstanding Literary Work, Debut Author
 Trevor Noah – Born A Crime: Stories from a South African Childhood
 Lisa Fenn – Carry On
 Nicole Gonzalez Van Cleve  Crook County: Racism and Injustice in America's Largest Criminal Court
 Natashia Deón – Grace: A Novel
 Cory Booker – United: Thoughts on Finding Common Ground and Advancing the Common Good

Outstanding Literary Work, Biography/Auto-Biography
 Trevor Noah – Born a Crime: Stories from a South African Childhood
 Taraji P. Henson – Around the Way Girl: A Memoir
 Nathaniel Jones – Answering the Call: An Autobiography of the Modern Struggle to End Racial Discrimination in America
 Mychal Denzel Smith – Invisible Man, Got the Whole World Watching, A Young Black Man's Education
 Herb Powell and Maurice White – My Life with Earth, Wind & Fire

Outstanding Literary Work, Instructional
 Daymond John and Daniel Paisner – The Power of Broke: How Empty Pockets, a Tight Budget, and a Hunger for Success Can Become Your Greatest Competitive Advantage
 JJ Smith – Green Smoothies for Life
 LA Reid – LA Reid Sing to Me: My Story of Making Music, Finding Magic, and Searching for Who's Next
 Joy M. Scott-Carrol and Anthony Sparks – Running the Long Race in Gifted Education: Narratives and Interviews from Culturally Diverse Gifted Adults
 The Dalai Lama, Desmond Tutu, and Douglas Abrams – The Book of Joy: Lasting Happiness in a Changing World

Outstanding Literary Work, Poetry
 Rita Dove – Collected Poems: 1974 – 2004
 Clint Smith – Counting Descent
 Jamaal May – The Big Book of Exit Strategies
 Joshua Bennett – The Sobbing School
 Phillip B. Williams – Thief in the Interior

Outstanding Literary Work, Children
 Andrea Davis Pinkney – A Poem for Peter: The Story of Ezra Jack Keats and the Creation of The Snowy Day
 Karissa Culbreath – Daddy's Little Girl
 Javaka Steptoe – Radiant Child: The Story of Young Artist Jean-Michel Basquiat
 Nikkolas Smith – The Golden Girls Of Rio
 Gwendolyn Hooks – Tiny Stitches: The Life of Medical Pioneer Vivien Thomas

Outstanding Literary Work, Youth/Teens
 Jason Reynolds – As Brave As You
 Christine Kendall – Riding Chance
 Holly Robinson Peete, Ryan Elizabeth Peete, and RJ Peete - Same But Different: Teen Life on the Autism Express
 Sharon Robinson – The Hero Two Doors Down: Based on the True Story of Friendship Between a Boy and a Baseball Legend
 Olugbemisola Rhuday-Perkovich and Audrey Vernick – Two Naomis

References

External links
 NAACP Image Awards official site

NAACP Image Awards
N
N
N
NAACP Image